Moonta may refer to:

Places 
Moonta, South Australia, a locality in the Copper Coast Council including:
East Moonta
Moonta Bay
Moonta Cemetery
Moonta Mines
North Moonta
Corporate Town of Moonta, a former local government area
New Moonta, a suburb in Bundaberg, Queensland

Ships 
MV Moonta, a cruise ship now used as a casino
SS Moonta (refer Moonta Herald and Northern Territory Gazette)